The Mud House is a historic home located at Penfield in Monroe County, New York. It is a -story,  rectangular earthen building with gable roof.  It was constructed about 1836 of clay, puddled with straw, and then rammed into forms above a fieldstone foundation and is a rare surviving example of rammed-earth construction.

It was listed on the National Register of Historic Places in 1978.

References

Houses on the National Register of Historic Places in New York (state)
Houses completed in 1836
Houses in Monroe County, New York
National Register of Historic Places in Monroe County, New York